BFI is the British Film Institute, a charitable organisation.

BFI may also refer to:

Companies
 Browning-Ferris Industries, American waste collection company
 BFI Canada, non-hazardous solid waste management company in North America

Governmental entities
 Bureau of Fraud Investigation, Irish national police division responsible for investigating fraudulent activity
 Boeing Field, Seattle, Washington, United States (by IATA airport code)

Non-commercial enterprises
 Big Five Inventory, survey for measuring Big Five personality traits
 Baby Friendly Initiative (UK), pro-breastfeeding campaign run by UNICEF UK as part of global Baby Friendly Hospital Initiative
 Becker Friedman Institute for Research in Economics, cross-disciplinary center for research in economics at University of Chicago
 Buckminster Fuller Institute, U.S. charitable institution dedicated to propagating ideas of Buckminster Fuller

Sports
 Basketball Federation of India